Gubeikou Town is a town of Miyun District in northeastern Beijing, traversed by , bordering with Luanping County, Hebei to the north and the Beijing towns of Gaoling to the west, Xinchengzi to the east and Taishitun. The area is one of the important passes of the Great Wall of China, serving as an ancient chokepoint for travelers between Northeast China and Beijing. As of 2020, it had a total population of 7,170 under its administration.

This town's name originated in 1736. During Qianlong Emperor's visit, he named this region by combining two inscrpted names, Guguan and Beikou, into Gubeikou that is still being used to this day.

History

Administrative divisions 
So far in 2021, Gubeikou Town is composed of 13 subdivisions, of which 4 are communities and 9 are villages. They are listed as follows:

Landmark 

 Simatai

Gallery

See also 
 List of township-level divisions of Beijing

References

External links

Illustrated Atlas of Shanhai, Yongping, Jizhou, Miyun, Gubeikou, Huanghua Zhen and Other Areas

Great Wall of China
Mountain passes of China
Miyun District
Towns in Beijing